Eimeria maxima is a protozoan that causes coccidiosis in poultry. It is located in the middle part of the intestine, on either side of Meckel's diverticulum, and frequently ascends into the duodenum. The lesions it causes are limited to the middle of the small intestine.

References

 

Conoidasida